A carimañola is a South American meat-pie in a torpedo-shaped yuca fritter, stuffed with cheese, seasoned ground meat or shredded chicken and fried. It is found in Colombia and Panama. They can be accompanied by suero.

Description 
Fresh cassava is boiled, cooled, mashed and mixed with flour or cornmeal, eggs, salt, and butter until a dough consistency. To construct the fritters, a piece of dough is placed in hand, meat and cheese in the center and form in to 2 inch ball then flatten into an oval. They are then deep-fried.

See also

 Colombian cuisine
 List of stuffed dishes

Panamanian cuisine
Colombian cuisine
Meat dishes
Stuffed dishes
Ground meat
Savoury pies